Essling is part of Donaustadt, the 22nd district of Vienna.

History
The oldest form of the place name was Ezzelaren. The Eslarn family had important roles in the Vienna city administration.
Konrad von Eslarn was mayor of Vienna in 1287. 
From about 1590, the place name changed into Ehsling or Essling.
The area is known for the Battle of Aspern-Essling, which was fought nearby between May 21 and May 22, 1809.

Sports clubs
The district is also known for their own soccer-team called SV Essling, which was founded in 1931, currently playing in the minor leagues.

Sights

 Essling Castle
 Essling Granary

References

External links

Donaustadt
Geography of Vienna